Streptocephalus kargesi is a species of crustacean in the family Streptocephalidae. It is endemic to Mexico.

References

Branchiopoda
Freshwater crustaceans of North America
Endemic crustaceans of Mexico
Taxonomy articles created by Polbot
Crustaceans described in 1985